Javier Antonio Guédez Sánchez (born October 15, 1982) is a male judoka from Venezuela. He won the bronze medal in the extra lightweight division (– 60 kg) at the 2007 Pan American Games in Rio de Janeiro, Brazil. He represented his native country at the 2008 Summer Olympics in Beijing, PR China and the 2012 Olympic Games in London.

External links
  sports-reference

1982 births
Living people
Venezuelan male judoka
Judoka at the 2007 Pan American Games
Judoka at the 2008 Summer Olympics
Judoka at the 2011 Pan American Games
Judoka at the 2012 Summer Olympics
Olympic judoka of Venezuela
Pan American Games bronze medalists for Venezuela
Pan American Games medalists in judo
Judoka at the 2015 Pan American Games
Central American and Caribbean Games gold medalists for Venezuela
Competitors at the 2006 Central American and Caribbean Games
Competitors at the 2010 Central American and Caribbean Games
South American Games silver medalists for Venezuela
South American Games bronze medalists for Venezuela
South American Games medalists in judo
Competitors at the 2006 South American Games
Central American and Caribbean Games medalists in judo
Medalists at the 2007 Pan American Games